The Central Tibetan School Administration is an autonomous Indian Government organisation under the Ministry of Education. The organisation is responsible for "establishing, managing and assisting schools in India for the education of Tibetan Children living in India while preserving and promoting their culture and heritage". This organisation is affiliated to Central Board of Secondary Education (CBSE)

The administration operates 71 schools across India with around 10,000 students. It employs 554 teaching staff and 239 non-teaching staff.

Plans have previously been announced to transfer responsibility for the schools to the Central Tibetan Administration.

See also 
 Central School for Tibetans

References

External links
 

1961 establishments in Delhi
Government agencies established in 1961
Government agencies of India
Educational organisations based in India
Ministry of Education (India)
Central Tibetan Administration